Tenthredo bifasciata  is a species of sawflies of the family Tenthredinidae.

Subspecies
 Tenthredo (Cephaledo) bifasciata bifasciata O. F. Muller, 1766 – head and thorax are blackish brown, front and middle tibias are entirely black
 Tenthredo (Cephaledo) bifasciata rossii (Panzer, 1804) - clear or silvery pubescence, white middle and lower tibias
 Tenthredo (Cephaledo) bifasciata violacea (Ed. Andre, 1881) - pronotum widely yellow (Eastern Europe)

Distribution
This species can be found in Europe.

Habitat
Tenthredo bifasciata mainly lives in meadows, especially close to forestry areas.

Description
The thorax and head are blackish brown. Abdomen shows one or two transversal white or pale yellow bands, sometimes interrupted. Wings are yellowinsh-brown and transparent.

Biology
These sawflies can be encountered from July to August. Adults mainly feed on nectar and pollen of Apiaceae, especially on Heracleum sphondylium. Larvae feed on Sonchus arvensis.

References

External links
  Bembix

Insects described in 1766
Tenthredinidae
Taxa named by Otto Friedrich Müller